Monument is the eighth studio album from German futurepop band Blutengel. It was released as a single CD, 2xCD digipack with Legend as the bonus disc, and a collectors edition box set with the 2xCD album and an EP entitled Dark & Pure featuring stripped down piano versions of existing Blutengel songs, arranged and performed by Conrad Oleak. Dark & Pure is the only bonus disc that has yet to be made available through digital retailers.
Monument is the first album to spawn not only three singles, Save Our Souls, You Walk Away & Kinder Dieser Stadt, but accompanying music videos. A video to No Eternity (Piano Version) was released for promotion but did not feature any of the band.

Track listing

References

External links

2013 albums
Blutengel albums